Carlo Villa may refer to:

 Carlo Villa (footballer) (1912–?), Italian footballer
 Carlo Villa (mayor) (1766–1846), mayor of Milan